Todor Kiselichkov (born 4 September 1975) is a former Bulgarian footballer and currently manager.

Career

Over the course of his career Kiselichkov played mainly in the top division of Bulgarian football, most notably for Neftochimic during their successful period in the 1990s. He was known as a skillful free kick taker.

On 10 July 2017, Kiselichkov was appointed as coach of Botev Plovdiv's U19 team. In August 2022, Kiselichkov took over as head coach of Spartak Varna.

Personal life

Kiselichkov is married to Milena and is the father of twin boys.

References

External links
 

1975 births
Living people
Sportspeople from Burgas
Bulgarian footballers
Association football midfielders
Neftochimic Burgas players
PFC Nesebar players
PFC Chernomorets Burgas players
First Professional Football League (Bulgaria) players